Caeneressa leucozona is a moth of the family Erebidae. It was described by George Hampson in 1911. It is found on Borneo. The habitat consists of primary forests.

References

Syntomini
Moths described in 1911